Cheyenne (  or  ) is the capital and most populous city of the U.S. state of Wyoming, as well as the county seat of Laramie County, with 65,132 residents, per the 2020 US Census. It is the principal city of the Cheyenne metropolitan statistical area which encompasses all of Laramie County and had 100,512 residents as of the 2020 census. Local residents named the town for the Cheyenne Native American people in 1867 when it was founded in the Dakota Territory.

Cheyenne is the northern terminus of the extensive Southern Rocky Mountain Front, which extends southward to Albuquerque, New Mexico, and includes the fast-growing Front Range Urban Corridor. Cheyenne is situated on Crow Creek and Dry Creek.

History

At a celebration on July 4, 1867, Grenville M. Dodge of the Union Pacific Railroad announced the selection of a townsite for its mountain region headquarters adjacent to the bridge the railroad planned to build across Crow Creek in the Territory of Dakota. At the same celebration, Major General Christopher C. Augur announced the selection of a site three miles (5 km) west of Crow Creek Crossing for a U.S. Army fort to protect the railroad.

The Union Pacific Railroad platted its Crow Creek Crossing townsite on July 5, 1867. Residents named the town Cheyenne for the Cheyenne Native American people. On August 8, 1867, the Town of Cheyenne, Dakota Territory was incorporated, and on August 10, 1867, H. M. Hook was elected as Cheyenne's first mayor. The tracks of the Union Pacific Railroad reached Cheyenne on November 13, 1867, and the first train arrived the following day. Cheyenne grew so quickly it gained the nickname of "Magic City of the Plains".

On September 8, 1867, the United States Army established Fort D.A. Russell in honor of Brigadier General David Allen Russell. Initially a cavalry encampment, construction of the fort began the following month. The fort was renamed Fort Francis E. Warren in 1930 in honor of the first Governor of the State of Wyoming, Francis E. Warren. The fort was transferred to the new United States Air Force and was renamed Francis E. Warren Air Force Base in October 1949.

On July 25, 1868, the United States organized the Territory of Wyoming. Territorial Governor John Allen Campbell arrived in Cheyenne on May 7, 1869, and named Cheyenne the temporary territorial capital. Cheyenne has remained the only capital of Wyoming.  On December 10, 1869, the first session of the Wyoming Territorial Legislature met in Cheyenne.  That day, the legislature passed and Territorial Governor Campbell signed an act to re-incorporate the Town of Cheyenne, Wyoming Territory, and an act granting white women the right to vote, the first U.S. state or territory to grant suffrage to some women.

On July 10, 1890, the Territory of Wyoming was admitted to the Union as the State  of Wyoming. The Wyoming State Capitol was constructed between 1886 and 1890, with further improvements being completed in 1917.

The Cheyenne Regional Airport was opened in 1920, initially serving as a stop for airmail. It soon developed into a civil-military airport, serving DC-3s and various military craft. During World War II, hundreds of B-17s, B-24s, and PBYs were outfitted and upgraded at the airfield. Today, it serves a number of military functions, and as a high-altitude testbed for civilian craft.

Geography
Lying near the southeast corner of the state, Cheyenne is one of the least centrally located state capitals in the nation (together with cities such as Carson City, Nevada; Juneau, Alaska; Tallahassee, Florida; and Topeka, Kansas).

Climate
Cheyenne, like much of Wyoming, has a cold semi-arid climate  (Köppen BSk) and is part of USDA Hardiness zone 5b, with the suburbs falling in zone 5a. However, the cold is often interrupted, with chinook winds blowing downslope from the Rockies that can bring warm conditions, bringing the high above  on twenty days from December to February.

Summers are warm, with a high diurnal temperature range; July averages , and highs reach  on average for twelve afternoons annually. Spring and autumn are quick transitions, with the average window for freezing temperatures being September 29 thru May 14, allowing a growing season of 106 days.

The city averages below 60% daily relative humidity in each month and receives an average  hours (~67% of the possible total) of sunshine annually. On July 16, 1979, an F3 tornado struck Cheyenne, causing one death and 40 injuries. It was the most destructive tornado in Wyoming history.

Demographics

In 2020, Cheyenne had a total population of 65,132. As of the census of 2010, there were 59,467 people, 25,558 households, and 15,270 families living in the city. As of the census of 2000, there were 53,011 people, 22,324 households, 14,175 families living in the city, and 81,607 people living in the metropolitan statistical area making it the largest city and metropolitan area in the state of Wyoming. The population density was 2,511.4 inhabitants per square mile (969.6/km2). There were 23,782 housing units at an average density of 1,126.7 per square mile (435.0/km2).

At the 2019 American Community Survey, the city had an owner-occupied housing rate of 65.9% with a median value at $214,300. There were 27,344 households from 2015 to 2019, and an average of 2.20 persons per household. Residents of Cheyenne had a median household income of $64,598 and per capita of $35,637. An estimated 10.4% lived at or below the poverty line.

In 2010, there were 25,558 households, of which 30.2% had children under the age of 18 living with them, 43.1% were married couples living together, 12.0% had a female householder with no husband present, 4.7% had a male householder with no wife present, and 40.3% were non-families. 33.5% of all households were made up of individuals, and 10.6% had someone living alone who was 65 years of age or older. The average household size was 2.29 and the average family size was 2.92. In 2000, there were 22,324 households, out of which 30.4% had children under the age of 18 living with them, 49.2% were married couples living together, 10.6% had a female householder with no husband present, and 36.5% were non-families. 31.3% of all households were made up of individuals, and 10.6% had someone living alone who was 65 years of age or older. The average household size was 2.33 and the average family size was 2.93.

The median age in the city was 36.5 years at the 2010 census. Twenty-four percent of residents were under the age of 18; 9.5% were between the ages of 18 and 24; 26.9% were from 25 to 44; 26.2% were from 45 to 64; and 13.5% were 65 years of age or older. The gender makeup of the city was 49.3% male and 50.7% female. In 2000, 24.9% under the age of 18, 8.8% from 18 to 24, 29.7% from 25 to 44, 22.8% from 45 to 64, and 13.8% 65 years of age or older. The median age was 37 years. For every 100 females, there were 95.3 males. For every 100 females age 18 and over, there were 92.7 males.

The median income for a household in the city was $38,856, and the median income for a family was $46,771. Males had a median income of $32,286 versus $24,529 for females. The per capita income for the city was $19,809. About 6.3% of families and 8.8% of the population were below the poverty line, including 11.1% of those under age 18 and 5.8% of those age 65 or over.

Ethnicity 
The U.S. Census Bureau estimated the racial and ethnic makeup of the city was 77.1% non-Hispanic white, 1.7% Black or African American, 0.6% American Indian or Alaska Native, 1.5% Asian, 0.2% Native Hawaiian or other Pacific Islander, 6.7% two or more races, and 15.9% Hispanic or Latin American of any race, in 2020.

In 2010, the racial makeup of the city was 87.44% White, 2.88% African American, 0.96% Native American, 1.24% Asian, 0.20% Pacific Islander, 4.0% from other races, and 3.28% from two or more races. Hispanic or Latino of any race were 14.45% of the population. At the 2005–2007 American Community Survey 3-Year Estimates, the city's population was 87.2% White (79.3% non-Hispanic White alone), 12.7% Hispanic or Latino (of any race), 4.5% Black or African American, 2.5% American Indian and Alaska Native, 2.1% Asian and 6.4% from some other race.

In 2000, the racial makeup of the city was 88.1% White, 2.8% Black or African American, 0.8% Native American, 1.1% Asian, 0.1% Pacific Islander, 4.4% from other races, and 2.7% from two or more races. 12.5% of the population were Hispanic or Latino of any race.

Arts and culture

Cheyenne Frontier Days, which is held over ten days centered around the last full week in July, is known as the largest outdoor rodeo and western festival in the world. The events include professional bull riding, calf roping, barrel racing, steer wrestling, team roping, bronc riding, steer roping, bareback riding, and many others. During this week there are many parades and other events. Additionally there is a carnival with numerous rides, games, and shops. The festival has been held since 1897.

Landmarks 

 Tivoli Building (Cheyenne, Wyoming)
 William Sturgis House
 Wyoming State Capitol
 F.E. Warren Air Force Base, one of the United States's oldest, continuously active installations (originally U.S. Army Fort D.A. Russell).
 Nagle Warren Mansion

National Register of Historic Places
Over fifty different locations in Cheyenne are listed on the National Register of Historic Places, including:

 The Historic Plains Hotel (added 1978)
 Atlas Theatre (added 1973)
 Union Pacific Depot (Cheyenne Depot Museum) (1973)
 the Governor's Mansion (1969)
 Nagle-Warren Mansion (1976)
 First Presbyterian Church (1869)
 First United Methodist Church (1975)
 St. Mark's Episcopal Church (1970)
 St. Mary's Catholic Cathedral (1974)
 Cheyenne High School (2005)
 High Plains Horticulture Research Station a.k.a. High Plains Arboretum (1930–1974)
 Storey Gymnasium (2005)
 Park Addition School (1970)
 Big Boy Steam Engine (1956)
 Botanic Gardens Rotary Century Plaza & Steam Locomotive (1921)

Several districts in the city are also listed, including:
 Downtown Cheyenne Historic District (1978, with boundary increase in 1980, 1988, 1996. Encompasses  and 67 buildings)
 Lakeview Historic District (1996, 350 acres and 109 buildings)
 Rainsford Historic District (1984, 1980 acres and 288 buildings)
 Capitol North Historic District (1980, 204 acres and 112 buildings)
 Fort David A. Russell (1969, 6,300 acres and 19 buildings)
 Union Pacific Roundhouse, Turntable and Machine Shop (1992, 113 acres and 2 buildings)
 South Side Historic District (2006)

Sports
Sports venues in Cheyenne include the Cheyenne Ice and Events Center, Pioneer Park, Powers Field, Bison Stadium and Okie-Blanchard Stadium.

The Cheyenne Warriors were founded as an American Professional Football League team in 2012. After playing a season in the APFL, they announced a move to the Indoor Football League. Shortly after the owner of the team died in December 2012, the Warriors announced that they were forming the new Developmental Football League. After playing several games in this new league, the team folded in May 2013.

Parks and recreation

The Cheyenne Community Recreation and Events Department operates an Ice and Events center, swimming pool, spray park, skateboard park, two golf courses, Cheyenne Botanic Gardens (including the Paul Smith Children's Village at the Gardens), paddle boat rentals in Lions Park (summers only), cemeteries, forestry operations, community house, Youth Activity Center and a miniature golf park.
The Cheyenne Parks and Recreation Department also operates a ) Greater Cheyenne Greenway system. The greenway connects parks and neighborhoods of greater Cheyenne. It includes many bridges and underpasses where travelers can avoid high traffic roads and travel above waterways and drainages. It is known that the famous bicycler, Cheyenne Otero, spent many weekends there training for marathons. sp  In 1996, as a result of the greenway, Cheyenne was named a "Trail Town USA" by the National Park service and the American Hiking Society.

Government

Cheyenne's government consists of a mayor and a city council, elected on a non-partisan basis. The mayor is elected in a citywide vote. The current Mayor, Patrick Collins, a bicycle shop owner, took office on January 4, 2021 with a term ending January 6, 2025. The city council has nine members each of whom are elected from one of three wards. Each ward elects three members. The mayor's office is responsible for managing the various city departments which consist of Police, Fire Rescue, Planning and Development, Engineering, Public Works, Treasury, Attorney’s Office, Human Resources, and Municipal Court. The Cheyenne Board of Public Utilities is owned by the city but is semi-autonomous.

Education
Public education in the city of Cheyenne is provided by Laramie County School District #1.  The district is served by four high schools, Central High on the northwest side, East High on the east side, South High on the south side, and Triumph High, also on the south side.

Cheyenne is home to the Laramie County Community College (LCCC), one of seven constituent campuses managed by the Wyoming Community College Commission.

Cheyenne has a public library, a branch of the Laramie County Library System.

Media

 Wyoming Tribune Eagle newspaper
 The Cheyenne Herald was written and published by Dave Featherly from 2002 to 2012.
 KGWN

Infrastructure

Transportation

Major highways

 – North–South Interstate running from New Mexico to Wyoming intersects I-80 southwest of Cheyenne.
 – East-West Interstate running from California to New Jersey. Intersects I-25 southwest of Cheyenne.
 – Bypass Interstate that runs concurrent with US 85 from I-80 to US 30.
 – East–west route through Cheyenne
 – North–South route through Cheyenne
 – North–South through Cheyenne that runs concurrent with I-25 through Cheyenne
 – East–west route from I-25/US 87 (Exit 10) west out of Cheyenne towards Laramie
 – Runs northwest out of Cheyenne to Horse Creek.
 – North–South route that forms a beltway around Cheyenne. From I-25 (Exit 7) to WYO 219
 – North–South route from US 85 in Cheyenne near the Cheyenne Airport north out of the city
 – East–west route from US 85 east to WYO 212 in Cheyenne
 –  North–South route from WYO 225 just southeast of Cheyenne and travels north to F.E. Warren Air Force Base and continues on its north route east of the city to WYO 221
 – East–west route from I-80/US 30 southwest of Cheyenne west

Public transit
Cheyenne provides local hourly bus service from 6:00a.m. – 7:00p.m. Monday to Friday and 10:00a.m. – 5:00p.m. on Saturday. There is no Sunday service.

Airports
Cheyenne Regional Airport features daily, nonstop airline service on United Express to Denver International Airport.

Railroads
The Union Pacific and BNSF railroads intersect in Cheyenne. The city is home to a BNSF railyard, as well as the Union Pacific's roundhouse that hosts their steam program. UP's operational steam locomotives 844 and 4014 reside in the steam shop, along with Challenger #3985 and DDA40X #6936.

Notable people

 Rink Babka (1936–2022), discus thrower, silver medalist at 1960 Rome Olympics and former world record holder
 Vernon Baker (1919–2010), Medal of Honor recipient
 James E. Barrett (1922–2011), U.S. federal judge
 Bryant B. Brooks (1861–1944), seventh governor of Wyoming 1905–1911
 Harriet Elizabeth Byrd (1926–2015), first African-American to serve in Wyoming Legislature
 Joseph M. Carey (1845–1924), mayor of Cheyenne, ninth governor of Wyoming (1911–15)
 Mark T. Cox IV (born 1942), former United States alternate executive director of the World Bank
 Rich Crandall (born 1967), member of Arizona State Senate
 Neil Diamond (born 1941), singer, lived in Cheyenne during his father's military service in World War II era
 David R. Edwards (1938–2013), late state representative from Converse County; born in Cheyenne in 1938
 Floyd Esquibel (born 1938), member of Wyoming Senate and former member of Wyoming House of Representatives
 Bill Garnaas (1921–2002), NFL player for Pittsburgh Steelers, 1946–48
 John Godina (born 1972), shot putter, silver medalist at 1996 Atlanta Olympics and a bronze medal at the 2000 Sydney games
 Mark Gordon (born 1957), 33rd governor of Wyoming
 Curt Gowdy (1919–2006), sportscaster, member of American Sportscasters Association Hall of Fame, recipient of Spink Award from baseball's Hall of Fame
 Robert Mills Grant (1926–2012), rancher, expert in branding law, state representative; born and died in Cheyenne but spent his life in Platte County
 Mildred Harris (c. 1903–1944), actress; first wife of actor Charlie Chaplin
 Cecilia Hart (1948–2016), actress; second wife of actor James Earl Jones
 William Jefferson Hardin (c. 1831–1889), first black member of the Wyoming House of Representatives
 Wild Bill Hickok (1837–1876), iconic gunfighter and lawman
 Robert Holding (1926–2013), founder of Grand America Hotels & Resorts
 Tom Horn (1860–1903), American Old West lawman, scout, soldier, hired gunman, detective, outlaw, assassin
 Jeremy Horst (born 1985), MLB pitcher with Cincinnati Reds (2011) and Philadelphia Phillies (2012–2013)
 George Clayton Johnson (1929–2015), fiction writer
 James Johnson (born 1987), professional basketball player with the NBA's Chicago Bulls, Toronto Raptors, Sacramento Kings, Memphis Grizzlies, and Miami Heat
Raymond A. Johnson (1912–1984), aviation pioneer
Wayne Harold Johnson (1942–2020), Republican member of both houses, respectively, of the Wyoming State Legislature from 1993 to 2016; resident of Cheyenne
Daniel Junge, documentary filmmaker, Academy Award winner for Saving Face
 Chris LeDoux (1948–2005), rodeo champion, country music legend; graduate of Cheyenne Central High
Phil Ligrani, professor of mechanical and aerospace engineering at the University of Alabama in Huntsville
 Cynthia Lummis (born 1954), US senator, former state treasurer and former member of United States House of Representatives
 Edgar Warner Mann (1851–1904), Wyoming territorial legislator, lawyer
 Marlin McKeever (1940–2006), defensive end for USC and NFL's Los Angeles Rams, Minnesota Vikings, Washington Redskins and Philadelphia Eagles
 Mike McKeever (1940–1967), All-American football player for USC, twin of Marlin McKeever
 Joseph B. Meyer (1941–2012), Wyoming attorney general, state treasurer
 Jennifer Nichols (born 1983), archer who competed in 2004, 2008 and 2012 Summer Olympics
 Brandon Nimmo (born 1993), baseball player for the New York Mets
 Leslie Osterman (1947–2021), member of Kansas House of Representatives; Cheyenne native
 Amalia Post (1826–1897), suffragist
 Tracy Ringolsby (born 1951), sportswriter and sportscaster
 Alvin Wiederspahn (1949–2014), Cheyenne lawyer, historical preservationist, rancher, and member of both houses of the Wyoming State Legislature; husband of U.S. Representative Cynthia Lummis

Sister cities
Cheyenne's sister cities are:

 Bismarck, North Dakota, United States
 Waimea, Hawaii County, Hawaii, United States
 Lompoc, California, United States
 Hammam Sousse, Tunisia
 Lourdes, France
 Taichung, Taiwan
 Voghera, Italy
 Accra, Ghana

See also
Cheyenne County, Jefferson Territory
First transcontinental railroad
List of municipalities in Wyoming
USS Cheyenne, 6 ships

Notes

References

External links

 
 
 

 
Cities in Laramie County, Wyoming
Wyoming placenames of Native American origin
County seats in Wyoming
Populated places established in 1867
1867 establishments in Dakota Territory
Cities in Wyoming
Railway towns in Wyoming